"Strangers" is a song by Belgian singers Laura Tesoro and Loïc Nottet, featuring Alex Germys. It was released on 6 November 2020 by Sony Music. The song was written by Amy Morrey, Laura Tesoro, Loïc Nottet and produced by Alex Germys.

Lyric video
A lyric video to accompany the release of "Strangers" was first released onto YouTube on 5 November 2020.

Critical reception
Jordi Pedra of Wiwibloggs wrote, "It's a mid-tempo piece that serves attitude and discusses the difficulties of love when things aren't working out anymore. Despite the relatively slow rhythm, the listener is drawn in by the song's message and the vocal delivery characterised by Nottet and Tesoro's distinctive voices. Loïc kicks things off with a powerful start, then Laura harmonises with him in the chorus before taking over as the song seamlessly flows into the second verse. As the end approaches, the duo meet again to explode in vocal perfection and sentiment."

Personnel
Credits adapted from Tidal.
 Alex Germys – Producer, composer, lyricist, associated performer
 Laura Tesoro – Composer, lyricist, associated performer
 Loïc Nottet – Composer, lyricist, associated performer
 Amy Morrey – Lyricist
 Charles De Schutter – Mixing Engineer
 Jerboa Mastering – Mixing Engineer

Charts

Weekly charts

Year-end charts

Certifications

References

2020 songs
2020 singles
Loïc Nottet songs
Songs written by Loïc Nottet